The 2016 Pine Bowl is a college football bowl game that will be played on Saturday, November 5, 2016, at the Sapporo Dome in Sapporo, Japan.  The 29th annual Pine Bowl will have Hokkaido University representing the Hokkaido American Football Association playing host to a team from the Tohoku Collegiate American Football Association.

References

External links

Pine Bowl (game)
2016 in Japanese sport
2016 in American football